Androcles and the Lion is a 1912 play written by George Bernard Shaw. The play is Shaw's retelling of the tale of Androcles, a slave who is saved by the requiting mercy of a lion.  In the play, Shaw portrays Androcles to be one of the many Christians being led to the Colosseum for torture.  Characters in the play exemplify several themes and takes on both modern and supposed early Christianity, including the cultural clash between Jesus' teachings and traditional Roman values.

Characters

Androcles (main character)
The Lion
Magaera
Centurion
Captain
Lavinia
Lentulus
Metellus
Spintho
Ferrovius
Ox-Driver
Call Boy
The Editor
Menagerie Keeper
Caesar
Secutor
Retiariu

Plot
Androcles, a fugitive Christian tailor, accompanied by his nagging wife, is on the run from his Roman persecutors. While hiding in the forest he comes upon a wild lion who approaches him with a wounded paw. His wife runs off. Androcles sees that the cause of the animal's distress is a large thorn embedded in its paw, which he draws out while soothing the lion in baby language.

Androcles is captured and is sent to the Colosseum to be executed with other Christians in gladiatorial combat. They are joined by a new Christian convert called Ferrovius, who struggles to reconcile his Christian principles with his violent inclinations. The Roman captain guarding them is attracted to the genteel convert Lavinia. Eventually the Christians are sent into the arena, but Ferrovius kills all the gladiators before they can harm any Christians. He is offered a job in the Praetorian Guard, which he takes. The Christians are to be released, but the crowd demands blood. To satisfy them, Androcles offers himself to be savaged by lions. But the lion that is supposed to kill him turns out to be the one that Androcles saved, and the two dance around the arena to the delight of the crowd. The emperor comes into the arena to get a closer look, and the lion attacks him. Androcles calls him off and the emperor is saved. He then declares an end to the persecution of Christians. Androcles and his new 'pet'  depart together.

Preface
The short play is often printed with a preface that includes a long examination of the Gospels by Shaw, in which Shaw analyzes the Bible and proclaims his findings. In summary, Shaw states that Jesus was a benevolent genius (in areas ranging from moral to social to economic) who eventually bought into popular ideas of his divinity and impending martyrdom. Shaw goes on to state that the teachings of Jesus were lost with his crucifixion, and that the Christian churches that followed are instead based on the teachings and philosophies of Paul (see Pauline Christianity) or Barabbas.  The preface is longer than the play.

Significance

The play was written at a time when the Christian Church was an important influence on society and there was strong pressure on non-believers in public life. The reversal of roles in the play possibly served to evoke empathy from his targeted audience. The characters also represent different "types" of Christian believers. The journey and outcome of each of the characters make it clear which believers Shaw sympathizes with the most, especially with Lavinia. One of the most famous passages of the play is Lavinia's metaphor of capturing a mouse to converting from Christianity to believing in the Roman gods, where Lavinia shows that the most important part of religion is earnestness and a lack of hypocrisy. Hypocrisy was a characteristic in the Church that Shaw condemned.

The play has themes of martyrdom and persecution which are portrayed through the vehicle of comedy. Another point in the play is his position against vivisection, which connected to his philosophy in being a vegetarian. In the play, Shaw uses slapstick, verbal wit and physical comedy to portray his themes.

In compliance with a bequest in Shaw's will, Androcles and the Lion was the first book printed in his Shavian alphabet when it was released in that orthography by Penguin Books in 1962, with an excerpt on the cover, including the title: .

Adaptations
A film version, Androcles and the Lion, was made of the play in 1952, produced by Gabriel Pascal.

There was a TV version in 1967 with Noël Coward.

A later film version, from 1984, was produced by Ronald Smedley.

A radio version was recorded by BBC Radio in 1967 and was most recently repeated on BBC Radio 4 Extra on 16 August 2021, Leslie French playing Androcles.

During the 2017 Season with Tim Carrol as artistic director, the Shaw Festival produced a radically different interpretation with an unprecedented amount of audience participation.  The Lion is/was played by an audience member, while a member of the cast chosen before production acted as an MC that would read the directions for the Lion to follow.  Before the play starts, the cast spends time talking and interacting with the audience at the Courtroom Theatre, and some cast members hand out coloured juggling balls, to be used to pick the Lion from the audience.  An audience member is called upon at the start of the play to choose a colour (red, green, blue or yellow), and the person holding that colour ball is then chosen as the lion.  During the 2nd act (the march to Rome) the remaining balls could be thrown down onto the "stage" where each ball would call out a different response.  For instance, if the yellow ball was the Lion, the green ball might pull a story, while the blue or red ball would call for what a cast member is thinking of at that particular time.  During intermission the coloured balls would be handed out again, and then once more be able to be thrown down on the "stage" and prompt the actors for other tidbits of information.  One colour would be for a summary of the epilogue, another for something an actor has gleaned from the massive prologue, that sort of thing.

References

Further reading

External links 

 

1912 plays
Plays by George Bernard Shaw
British plays adapted into films
Plays set in ancient Rome